"Moments" is the thirty-second single released by Ayumi Hamasaki and her nineteenth number-one single. It came out March 31, 2004. "Moments" was the first single in 2004 released by Hamasaki. The single debuted at the number one spot for the daily, weekly and monthly Japanese charts and went on to sell over 310,000 copies throughout its release. "Moments" was also featured on the album My Story, which came out in December that same year.

There were two versions, a CD only, and a CD+DVD version. Moments was Ayumi's first single to be released in two versions, all of her singles up until 2014's Terminal have been released like this.

Music video
The music video was first aired MTV Japan on March 27, 2004 and the video was directed by Tetsuo Inoue.

It features Ayumi dreaming that she wakes up in the night and then opens a door and sees serveal kids in a dreamy flower room and she then starts smiling, but then the scene changes where she is in a dark room what is filled with fluff and her face is painted in a dark snake style. Ayumi then closes the door of the flower room and she walks away and then ends with her looking at the camera. There were also in-ter cut scenes of Ayumi in living room.

Track listing
 "Moments" – 5:31
 "Moments" (acoustic piano version) - 5:33
 "Moments" (Flying Humanoid mix) - 6:45
 "Moments" (instrumental) – 5:31

DVD track listing
 "Moments" (PV)

Live performances
 March 6, 2004 – Ayu Ready?
 March 26, 2004 – AX Music
 March 27, 2004 – CDTV
 April 2, 2004 – PopJam
 April 5, 2004 – Hey! Hey! Hey!
 April 9, 2004 – Music Station ("Moments ~acoustic version~")
 May 22, 2004 – MTV Super Dry Live
 December 1, 2004 – FNS Music Festival
 December 31, 2004 – Kouhaku Uta Gassen

Charts
 Oricon Sales Chart (Japan)

  Total Sales :  370,000 (Japan)
  Total Sales :  390,000 (Avex)
 RIAJ certification: Platinum

Use in other media
 "Moments" was used as the opening song for the Fullmetal Alchemist Chinese doujin game, Bluebird's Illusion, which was developed by Neoland OceanX.

References

External links
 "Moments" information at Avex Network.
 "Moments" CD+DVD information at Avex Network.
 "Moments" information at Oricon.

Ayumi Hamasaki songs
2004 singles
Oricon Weekly number-one singles
Songs written by Ayumi Hamasaki
2004 songs
Avex Trax singles